John Leonard Sadler (born 19 November 1981) is an English cricketer and cricket coach. He is the head coach of Northamptonshire who succeeded David Ripley following the 2021 season. As a player, Sadler played county cricket for Yorkshire, Leicestershire and Derbyshire, and also represented the Yorkshire Cricket Board.

Sadler joined the Derbyshire coaching staff in January 2014 and took over as head coach on an interim basis in June 2016, following the departure of Graeme Welch. The club later confirmed Sadler would remain in charge for the rest of the season, with the possibility of him retaining the role on a permanent basis.

After a spell on the Leicestershire coaching staff, he joined Northamptonshire for the 2020 season. He succeeded David Ripley as head coach in September 2021.

Sadler has cited former Leicestershire batsman Tom New as his idol.

References

Leicestershire cricketers
Cricketers from Dewsbury
1981 births
Living people
English cricketers
Derbyshire cricketers
Yorkshire cricketers
Yorkshire Cricket Board cricketers
English cricket coaches
Suffolk cricketers
English cricketers of 1969 to 2000
English cricketers of the 21st century